Pila wernei is a species of gastropod belonging to the family Ampullariidae.

The species is found in Africa.

References

Ampullariidae